The Chesham River is a tributary of the rivière au Saumon, in the administrative region of Estrie, in the province of Quebec, in Canada. This river flows successively in the municipalities of:
MRC Le Granit Regional County Municipality: in the township of Chesham in municipality of Notre-Dame-des-Bois;
MRC Le Haut-Saint-François Regional County Municipality: in the township of Ditton La Patrie.

Forestry is the main economic activity in this. valley

The surface of the Chesham River is usually frozen from mid-December to mid-March, except the rapids areas; however, safe circulation on the ice is generally from late December to early March.

Geography 

The hydrographic slopes near the "Chesham River" are:
 north side: Saint-François River, Rouge River (rivière au Saumon);
 east side: Victoria River, Clinton River, Bergeron River;
 south side: rivière au Saumon, West Branch Magalloway (United States);
 west side: rivière au Saumon.

The Chesham River originates at the confluence of two mountain streams located on the southern flank of a mountain which is located between Mégantic Mountain (located on the west side) and Sommet Valence (located on the east side).

  westwards, up to its confluence with a stream (coming from the northeast);
  southwards, up to the confluence with the Fromagerie stream (coming from the north-west);
  to the southwest, crossing route 212, to the confluence of Deloge stream;
  south-west, to its mouth.

The Chesman River flows on the northeast bank of the rivière au Saumon.

Toponymy 

The term "Chesham" refers to a town in the Chilterns, in Buckinghamshire, in England.

The toponym "Chesham River" was formalized on December 5, 1968, at the Commission de toponymie du Québec.

Notes and references 

Rivers of Estrie
Le Haut-Saint-François Regional County Municipality
Le Granit Regional County Municipality